A pine is any coniferous tree of the genus Pinus.

Pine may also refer to:

Vegetation

Species in the genus Araucaria including:
Araucaria angustifolia, Brazilian pine
Araucaria araucana, Chilean pine
Araucaria bidwillii, Bunya pine
Araucaria heterophylla, Norfolk Island pine
Species in the genus Athrotaxis including:
Athrotaxis cupressoides, pencil pine
 Athrotaxis selaginoides, King Billy pine 
Lagarostrobos franklinii, Huon pine or Macquarie pine
Nauclea orientalis, Leichhardt pine, in family Rubiaceae
Neolamarckia cadamba, Leichhardt pine, in family Rubiaceae
 Screw pine, various species of plants in the genus Pandanus
 Wollemi pine, Wollemia nobilis, a coniferous tree
 Ground pine or running pine, certain species of clubmoss in the genus Diphasiastrum
 Pine, a generic term for any needled coniferous tree

Places

United States
 Pine, Arizona
 Loomis, California, formerly known as Pine
 Pine, Colorado
 Pine, Louisiana
 Pine, Missouri
 Pine, Oregon
 Pine County, Minnesota
 Pine Creek (disambiguation)
 Pine Island (Lee County, Florida)
 Pine Township (disambiguation)

People
 Albert M. Pine, the real name of the fictional character Alpine from the G.I. Joe franchise
 Chris Pine (born 1980), an American actor
 Courtney Pine (born 1964), a British jazz musician
 David Pine (diplomat), New Zealand ambassador
 David Andrew Pine (1891–1970), a United States district court judge
 Emilie Pine (born 1978), Irish novelist
 Nathan Pine, American Director of Athletics at the College of the Holy Cross.
 Kim "Pine" Do-hyeon, professional Overwatch player

Other uses
 Pine Tree Flag, one of the flags used during the American Revolution
 Pine (email client), email software developed by the University of Washington
 Pine (video game), released in 2019
 "Pine", a song by Basement from their 2012 album Colourmeinkindness
 Pine, an alternative name of the Bine language of Papua New Guinea

See also

 Ground pine (disambiguation)
 Pines (disambiguation)
 Pinetree (disambiguation)
 Piney Winston, a fictional character on Sons of Anarchy